The Central District of Marivan County is a district (bakhsh) in Marivan County, Kurdistan Province, Iran. At the 2006 census, its population was 128,445, in 30,732 families.  The District has one city: Marivan. The District has three rural districts (dehestan): Kumasi Rural District, Sarkal Rural District, and Zarivar Rural District.

References 

Marivan County
Districts of Kurdistan Province